Beļava Manor is a manor house in , Beļava Parish, Gulbene Municipality, in  historical region of Vidzeme, in northern Latvia.

History 
It was built around 1760 in Baroque style. The building currently houses the Krišjānis Valdemārs primary school.

See also
List of palaces and manor houses in Latvia

References

External links
  Beļava Manor

Manor houses in Latvia
Baroque architecture in Latvia